Government Degree College Mathra Peshawar is public sector college located on Warsak Road, Mathra, Peshawar Khyber Pakhtunkhwa, Pakistan. The college offers programs for intermediate both in Arts and Science groups affiliate with Board of Intermediate And Secondary Education Peshawar plus BA & BSc programs which are affiliated with University of Peshawar.

Overview & History 
Government Degree College Mathra Peshawar was established in May 2001 in Mathra village on the outskirts of Peshawar city. The college is initially started in old elementary college building at Mathra.

Vision 
 To be a forward-looking center for quality education where all the stakeholders have open opportunities of discourse and wisdom. 
 To equip the students’ community with a range of practices to identify, create, and distribute knowledge and skills in their chosen stream thereby infusing emotional investment in the shape of values. 
 To shape the learners into future leaders and entrepreneurs in diverse fields and above all into good human beings.

Programs 
The college currently offers the following programs.
 FSc – Pre-Medical (2 years)
 FSc – Pre-Engineering (2 years)
 FSc – Computer Science (2 years)
 FA – General Science (2 years)
 FA – Humanities (2 years)

Faculties And Departments 
The college currently has the following faculties and departments.
 Department of Arabic
 Department of Botany
 Department of Chemistry
 Department of Computer Sciences
 Department of Economics
 Department of English
 Department of Health & Physical Education
 Department of History
 Department of Islamiyat
 Department of Law
 Department of Library Science
 Department of Mathematics
 Department of Pakistan Studies
 Department of Pashto
 Department of Physics
 Department of Political Science
 Department of Statistics
 Department of Urdu
 Department of Zoology

See also  
 Edwardes College Peshawar
 Islamia College Peshawar
 Government College Peshawar
 Government Superior Science College Peshawar
 Government College Hayatabad Peshawar
 Government Degree College Naguman Peshawar
 Government Degree College Mathra Peshawar
 Government Degree College Badaber Peshawar
 Government Degree College Chagarmatti Peshawar
 Government Degree College Wadpagga Peshawar
 Government Degree College Achyni Payan Peshawar

References

External links 
 Government Degree College Mathra Peshawar Official Website

Colleges in Peshawar
Universities and colleges in Peshawar